is a Japanese musician, singer and songwriter who was born in Nishinomiya, Hyōgo Prefecture. He is most famous for being the lead vocalist of heavy metal band Anthem. In the 1990s he started up the band Animetal which performed heavy metal covers of anime and tokusatsu opening and closing themes. He also was involved with the Anison band JAM Project before reuniting with Anthem. Sakamoto then began a new project called Eizo Japan which is similar to Animetal: more heavy metal covers of theme songs post-disbanding, along with original material.

Discography

Albums
[2000] 
[2002] Shout Drunker
[2003] 
[2006] 
[2014.03.08] Heavenly Days

Eizo Japan
[2008.08.26] Eizo Japan 1
[2009.12.02] Eizo Japan 2
[2010.08.25] Eizo Japan 3
[2010.10.23]

Anthem
[1985] Anthem 
[1985] Ready To Ride
[1986] Tightrope 
[1986] Xanadu (Promotional Single For The 1985 Video Game Xanadu: Dragon Slayer II)
[1987] Bound To Break 
[2001] Seven Hills 
[2002] Overload 
[2004] Eternal Warrior 
[2006] Immortal 
[2008] Black Empire 
[2011] Heraldic Device 
[2012] Burning Oath

Singles

For Kamen Rider Hibiki

Miscellaneous
[1998] Another Face
Collaboration with Bunkyo Gakudan
[2010] CRYING STARS - ~STAND PROUD!~ 
Guest vocals on two songs of the Syu's cover album
[2020] Tatakae Otaking!
Collaboration with The Chilean Band RageQuit

External links
 
Eizo Japan's official site 

1964 births
Living people
20th-century Japanese male singers
21st-century Japanese male singers
Japanese male rock singers
Japanese heavy metal singers
Anthem (band) members
People from Nishinomiya
Anime musicians
Musicians from Hyōgo Prefecture
JAM Project members
Animetal members